Thetis Lake is a name that refers to two freshwater lakes (Upper and Lower Thetis) connected by a narrow culvert in the  Thetis Lake Regional Park outside Victoria, British Columbia, about  from the city centre. It was established as Canada's first nature sanctuary in 1958.  The park was named for the frigate HMS Thetis, which had been assigned to Esquimalt as part of the Royal Navy's Pacific Squadron. Thetis is encountered in Greek mythology mostly as a sea nymph or known as the goddess of water, one of the fifty Nereids, daughters of the ancient sea god Nereus. The park's facilities include several beaches, kilometres of forest trails, parking, washrooms and a change room. The two lakes are extremely popular in the summer. The area features many Garry oak and Douglas fir trees.

See also 
 Thetis Lake Monster
 Lost Lake

References

External links
 Thetis Lake Regional Park
 Victoria Trails Thetis Lake"
 WikiMapia

Lakes of Vancouver Island
Lakes of British Columbia
Parks in Victoria, British Columbia
Highland Land District